Antal Kovács (born 28 May 1972 in Paks, Tolna) is a Hungarian judoka.

He was elected Hungarian Sportsman of The Year in 1993 for winning a gold medal at that year's World Judo Championships.

Achievements

References

External links
 
 
 

1972 births
Living people
Hungarian male judoka
Judoka at the 1992 Summer Olympics
Judoka at the 1996 Summer Olympics
Judoka at the 2000 Summer Olympics
Judoka at the 2004 Summer Olympics
Olympic judoka of Hungary
Olympic gold medalists for Hungary
Olympic medalists in judo
World judo champions
Medalists at the 1992 Summer Olympics
20th-century Hungarian people
21st-century Hungarian people